Jürgen Melzer was the defending champion, but lost in the first round to Andreas Seppi.

Sixth-seeded Gilles Simon won in the final 4–6, 6–3, 6–2, against Victor Hănescu.

Seeds

Draw

Finals

Top half

Bottom half

External links
Draw
Qualifying draw

Singles